"If You Leave" is a 1986 song by English electronic band Orchestral Manoeuvres in the Dark (OMD). It was recorded for the soundtrack to the film Pretty in Pink (1986), in which it is played prominently during the final scene. Along with 1980's "Enola Gay", the track has been described as OMD's signature song.

"If You Leave" is the group's highest-charting single on the US Billboard Hot 100, where it reached number 4 in May 1986. The song was also a Top 5 entry in Canada and New Zealand, and charted at number 15 in Australia. A defining track of the 1980s, it was described by Interview as "one of the most influential, zeitgeist-capturing songs ever to be written".

Composition
The end of the film Pretty in Pink, set in a high school prom, was originally meant to feature the OMD song "Goddess of Love" (which the band released on The Pacific Age later in 1986.) However, director John Hughes decided to change the ending to Pretty in Pink after poor test audience reactions, and felt that the new ending required a song with different lyrical content. Hughes asked OMD for a new song to match the feel of the ending, and also specified that it should be written at a tempo of 120 BPM, to match the speed of "Don't You (Forget About Me)", which the actors in the scene had danced to during filming. This request came two days before OMD were due to begin a tour, and as a result "If You Leave" was written and recorded in under 24 hours.

Lyrically the band has stated that the song is about "The end of high school... the ending of your childhood", elaborating that they were trying to capture "this fear of what comes next". Singer Andy McCluskey later noted that an editing error meant the dancing appears out of sync despite the matched tempo.

Critical reception and legacy
"If You Leave" has garnered both praise and derision since its release. Ian Cranna in Smash Hits wrote that the song is "false and contrived and seems to last about 3 years" (but described UK B-side "88 Seconds in Greensboro" as "OMD at their blazing best"). On the other hand, Billboards Brian Chin dubbed it a "magical beat/ballad" and a "key cut" from the Pretty in Pink soundtrack. Retrospectively, Alfred Soto of The Village Voice said the track "starts promisingly" and features "admirably straightforward" lyrics, but concluded: "Gradually the annoyances become menaces. The parts are garish, overstated; it's a cluttered mix." Trouser Press called the song a "dull ballad" that "was thankfully omitted from OMD's subsequent album, The Pacific Age".

Conversely, Stereogum critic Ryan Leas considered the track to be among "the best songs of the '80s", and described its intro/chorus synthesizer melody as "one of the best sounds ever". Andrew Unterberger in Stylus Magazine said that the "gorgeous" song makes the final scene of Pretty in Pink "one of the best in cinematic history". AllMusic journalist Mike DeGagne named "If You Leave" as the best track from Pretty in Pink, adding that "its adult feel and smooth transition from stanza to chorus makes it [OMD's] most memorable song".

Hugo Lindgren in The New York Times Magazine argued that the stateside popularity of "If You Leave" – as well as that of the similarly pop-oriented Crush (1985) – "obscured OMD's legacy as musical innovators" from US audiences, and marked a shift toward "making music for whoever signed the checks". Listeners in OMD's native UK – where the band had gained an audience with edgy, experimental music – were particularly resistant to the track, which peaked at no. 48 on the UK Singles Chart. Frontman Andy McCluskey commented: "It's a blessing to have such a big hit, but a shame that it overshadows so many other good songs for the US audience. We have many European fans who hate the song." Along with 1980's "Enola Gay", "If You Leave" has been described as OMD's signature song.

In 2016, Entertainment Weekly journalist Dana Falcone described "If You Leave" as a "now-classic tune" and "OMD's best-known song to Americans". Kevin Wuench of the Tampa Bay Times dubbed the track "a signature song of the '80s that will never leave the radio", while Interview called it "one of the most influential, zeitgeist-capturing songs ever to be written". The track has been included in various "greatest songs" listings; KOOL-FM named it the third-best new wave song of the 1980s, while Time Out ranked it the 10th greatest track of 1980s cinema. KROQ positioned "If You Leave" as the 16th-best song of 1986; in a poll of 6,528 Slicing Up Eyeballs readers, it was voted the fifth-greatest song of the year.

Track listing

7": Virgin / VS 843 (UK) 
 "If You Leave" – 4:30
 "88 Seconds in Greensboro" – 4:20

7": A&M/Virgin / AM 8669 (US) 
 "If You Leave" – 4:24
 "Secret" – 3:57

7": A&M/Virgin / AM 2811 (US) 
 "If You Leave" - 4:24
 "La Femme Accident" - 3:58

12": Virgin / VS 843-12 (UK) 
 "If You Leave" (extended version) – 5:59
 "88 Seconds in Greensboro" – 4:20
 "Locomotion" (live version) – 3:50

12": A&M/Virgin / SP-12176 (US) 
 "If You Leave" (extended version) – 5:59
 "La Femme Accident" (extended version) – 5:36

Personnel
Orchestral Manoeuvres in the Dark
 Andy McCluskey – bass guitar, keyboards, vocals
 Paul Humphreys – keyboards, vocals
 Martin Cooper – keyboards, saxophone
 Malcolm Holmes – drums and percussion
 Graham Weir – guitar, brass, keyboards
 Neil Weir – brass, keyboards, bass guitar

Charts

Weekly charts

Year-end charts

Other appearances
 The OMD  greatest hits albums The Best of OMD,  The OMD Singles and Messages: The Greatest Hits.
 "If You Leave" was featured in the compilation album Lost & Found: Reconstruction.

Cover versions
 "If You Leave" was covered by pop-punk band Good Charlotte for the soundtrack of Not Another Teen Movie (2001), a parody on teen movies like Pretty in Pink.
 A cover version by Nada Surf was used on an episode of The O.C. It is played as a tribute to the John Hughes film Pretty in Pink where the original OMD version of the song appeared. It was released on Music from the OC: Mix 2.
 LMP covered the song on their album A Century of Song.
 In 2001, "If You Leave" was covered by Seattle synthpop band Dyed Emotions on the OMD tribute compilation Messages: Modern Synthpop Artists Cover Orchestral Manoeuvres in the Dark.
 Indie rock band Rafter covered the song for the compilation album Guilt by Association Vol. 2, released in 2008.
In 2021 "If You Leave" was covered by the American singer-songwriter and musician Angel Olsen for her fourth extended play, Aisles, consisting of five cover versions of popular songs from the 1980s.

Notes

References

External links
 

1986 songs
1986 singles
Orchestral Manoeuvres in the Dark songs
Songs written for films
Songs written by Paul Humphreys
Songs written by Andy McCluskey
Virgin Records singles
A&M Records singles